UCCB can refer to:
 The University College of Cape Breton, a Canadian university located in the province of Nova Scotia;
 The Universal Canada Child Benefit a former childcare benefit paid by the Government of Canada  between 2006 and 2016.